Sirannon may refer to:

Sirannon, a river in the fictional word of Middle-earth
Sirannon, an open source media server